Psidium cinereum, called katuaba,  is a species of plant in the family Myrtaceae. It is endemic to Brazil. It is becoming rare due to habitat loss. A relative of guava, it is sometimes used in herbal concoctions.

References

Endemic flora of Brazil
cinereum
Near threatened plants
Taxonomy articles created by Polbot